Euzophera cocciphaga is a species of snout moth in the genus Euzophera. It was described by George Hampson in 1908 and is known from India.

This species has a wingspan of 24 mm and the larvae lives under a Coccidae (scale insect) on which it feeds.

References

Moths described in 1908
Phycitini
Moths of Asia